Housaper is an Armenian language And Arabic daily published in Cairo, Egypt.

It was established in 30 March 1915, and until 1926, it was published three times a week, before becoming a daily published on weekdays. In 1923, it became an official organ of the Armenian Revolutionary Federation (Dashnaktsutyun) in Egypt. Some of the editors in chief of the paper were S. Bartevian, S Yesayan, V. Navasartian, K. Lazian, G. Goganyan, S Bayramian, and Z. Lylozian. Besides its coverage of the Armenian political, economic, social, and cultural scenes in Egypt, Armenia, and the Armenian diaspora, a number of renowned writers have published literary works in the paper, including Arpiar Arpiarian, Vahan Tekeyan, and Yervant Odian.

References

External links 
 Official Website
 Twitter account
 Facebook page

Armenian diaspora in Egypt
Armenian-language newspapers
Daily newspapers published in Egypt
Newspapers established in 1913
Newspapers published in Cairo
1913 establishments in Egypt
Non-Arabic-language newspapers published in Egypt